Two-time defending champion Novak Djokovic defeated Milos Raonic in the final, 6–2, 6–0 to win the men's singles tennis title at the 2016 Indian Wells Masters. It was his then-record-breaking fifth Indian Wells title, before Roger Federer tied the record the following year.

Seeds
All seeds receive a bye into the second round.

Draw

Finals

Top half

Section 1

Section 2

Section 3

Section 4

Bottom half

Section 5

Section 6

Section 7

Section 8

Qualifying

Seeds

Qualifiers

Qualifying draw

First qualifier

Second qualifier

Third qualifier

Fourth qualifier

Fifth qualifier

Sixth qualifier

Seventh qualifier

Eighth qualifier

Ninth qualifier

Tenth qualifier

Eleventh qualifier

Twelfth qualifier

References
Main Draw
Qualifying Draw

Men's Singles